The Center for National Documents and Records (est. 1977) serves as the national archives of Liberia. It was headquartered on Tubman Boulevard in the Sinkor section of the city of Monrovia until 1992, when it moved to Ashmun Street. Directors have included Philomena Bloh Sayeh.

References

Bibliography
 
  . (Includes information about new archives building on Tubman Boulevard in Monrovia)
 
 
 . (Includes information about Liberian national archives)

External links
 Official site
 
 
 

Liberian culture
History of Liberia
Liberia
Monrovia
1977 establishments in Liberia